is a Japanese para badminton player. He won the gold medal in the men singles WH2 and bronze medal in the men doubles WH1–WH2 event of the 2020 Summer Paralympics.

Achievements

Paralympic Games 
Men's singles WH2

Men's doubles WH1–WH2

World Championships 
Men's singles WH2

Asian Youth Para Games 
Boys' singles

BWF Para Badminton World Circuit (12 titles, 1 runner-up) 
The BWF Para Badminton World Circuit – Grade 2, Level 1, 2 and 3 tournaments has been sanctioned by the Badminton World Federation from 2022.

Men's singles

Men's doubles

International Tournaments (2 titles, 4 runners-up) 
Men's singles

Men's doubles

References

2001 births
Living people
Paralympic badminton players of Japan
Badminton players at the 2020 Summer Paralympics
Medalists at the 2020 Summer Paralympics
Paralympic gold medalists for Japan
Paralympic bronze medalists for Japan
Paralympic medalists in badminton
Japanese male badminton players
Japanese para-badminton players
21st-century Japanese people